Adrian Rodrigo Ávalos  (born 25 November 1974 in Córdoba) is an Argentine footballer who plays for Deportivo Maipú.

Club career
Ávalos previously played for Talleres de Córdoba, Belgrano and Huracán in the Primera División Argentina. He also had a brief spell with Manta in Ecuador.

References

1974 births
Living people
Argentine people of Greek descent
Argentine footballers
Talleres de Córdoba footballers
Club Atlético Belgrano footballers
Club Atlético Huracán footballers
Independiente Rivadavia footballers
Atlético Tucumán footballers
Racing de Córdoba footballers
Expatriate footballers in Ecuador
Footballers from Córdoba, Argentina
Association football midfielders